The 2018 Texas Bowl was a college football bowl game that was played on December 27, 2018, with kickoff at 9:00 p.m. EST. It was the 13th edition of the Texas Bowl, and was one of the 2018–19 bowl games concluding the 2018 FBS football season. Sponsored by the Academy Sports + Outdoors sporting goods company, the game was officially known as the Academy Sports + Outdoors Texas Bowl.

The 2018 Texas Bowl featured the Baylor Bears of the Big 12 Conference and the Vanderbilt Commodores of the Southeastern Conference.  Both teams had a 6–6 record coming in to the game, making the Texas Bowl the only bowl game of the season without a team with a winning record. Despite featuring a pair of .500 teams, fans were treated to one of the highest-scoring games of the bowl season that included five touchdown plays of 50 yards or more, and more than 1,200 yards (combined) of total offense.

Teams
The matchup of Baylor from the Big 12 Conference and Vanderbilt from the Southeastern Conference (SEC) was announced on December 2. The teams had previously met twice, with Baylor winning both games, played in 1953 and 1954.

Baylor Bears 

Baylor received and accepted a bid to the Texas Bowl on December 2. The Bears entered the bowl with a 6–6 record (4–5 in conference).

Vanderbilt Commodores 

Vanderbilt received and accepted a bid to the Texas Bowl on December 2. The Commodores entered the bowl with a 6–6 record (3–5 in conference).

Game summary

Scoring summary

Statistics

References

External links
 Box score at ESPN

Texas Bowl
Texas Bowl
Baylor Bears football bowl games
Vanderbilt Commodores football bowl games
Texas Bowl
Texas Bowl
Texas Bowl